Abbeville Chris Crusta Memorial Airport  is a city-owned, public-use airport located three nautical miles (4 mi, 6 km) east of the central business district of Abbeville, a city in Vermilion Parish, Louisiana, United States.

Although most U.S. airports use the same three-letter location identifier for the FAA and IATA, this airport is assigned IYA by the FAA but has no designation from the IATA.

Facilities and aircraft 
It has one runway designated 16/34 with an asphalt surface measuring 5,000 by 75 feet (1,524 x 23 m).

For the 12-month period ending July 14, 2010, the airport had 92,345 aircraft operations, an average of 253 per day: 53% air taxi, 46% general aviation and 1% military. At that time there were 63 aircraft based at this airport: 44% single-engine, 5% multi-engine, 3% jet, 43% helicopter, 2% glider and 3% ultralight.

References

External links 
 Aerial photo as of 24 February 1999 from USGS The National Map
 

Airports in Louisiana
Abbeville, Louisiana
Buildings and structures in Vermilion Parish, Louisiana